Immersion silver plating  (or IAg plating) is a surface plating process that creates a thin layer of silver over copper objects.  It consists in dipping the object briefly into a solution containing silver ions.

Immersion silver plating is used by the electronics industry in manufacture of printed circuit boards (PCBs), to protect copper conductors from oxidation and improve solderability.

Advantages and disadvantages
Immersion silver coatings have excellent surface planarity, compared more traditional coating processes such as hot air solder leveling (HASL). They also have low losses in high-frequency applications due to the skin effect.

On the other hand, silver coatings will degrade over time due to oxidation or air contaminants such as sulfur compounds and chlorine. A problem peculiar to silver coatings is the formation of silver whiskers under electric fields, which may short out components.

Specifications
IPC Standard: IPC-4553

See also
 Electroless nickel immersion gold (ENIG)
 Hot air solder leveling (HASL)
 Organic solderability preservative (OSP)
 Reflow soldering
 Wave soldering

References

External links
PCB Assembly & PCBA Manufacturing
Bluetooth PCBA Manufacturing

Printed circuit board manufacturing